The 1985 Atlantic hurricane season was an event in the annual Atlantic hurricane season in the north Atlantic Ocean. It featured average activity overall, with thirteen tropical cyclones, eleven tropical storms, seven hurricanes, and three major hurricanes. The season officially began on June 1, 1985 and ended November 30, 1985. These dates, adopted by convention, historically describe the period in each year when most systems form. The season's first storm, Tropical Storm Ana, developed on July 15; the season's final storm, Tropical Depression Thirteen, dissipated on December 9.

The 1985 season was particularly destructive and disruptive for the United States, with damage amounting to a then-record US$4 billion. The entire coastline from Brownsville, Texas, to Eastport, Maine, was under a gale warning at some point during the year and a portion of every coastal state was under a hurricane warning. Eight tropical cyclones made landfall in the United States, including a record-tying six hurricanes, the most in a single year since 1916.

This timeline documents tropical cyclone formations, strengthening, weakening, landfalls, extratropical transitions, and dissipations during the season. It includes information that was not released throughout the season, meaning that data from post-storm reviews by the National Hurricane Center, such as a storm that was not initially warned upon, has been included.

By convention, meteorologists one time zone when issuing forecasts and making observations: Coordinated Universal Time (UTC), and also use the 24-hour clock (where 00:00 = midnight UTC). In this time line, all information is listed by UTC first with the respective local time included in parentheses.

Timeline

June
June 1
The 1985 Atlantic hurricane season officially begins.

July

July 15
18:00 UTC (2:00 p.m.
July 16
18:00 UTC (2:00 p.m.
July 19
00:00 UTC (8:00 p.m.
July 21
06:00 UTC (2:00 a.m.
July 22
18:00 UTC (2:00 p.m.
July 23
Between 12:00 and 18:00 UTC (between 8:00 a.m. and 2:00 p.m.
July 24
18:00 UTC (2:00 p.m.
July 25
00:00 UTC (8:00 p.m.
July 26
00:00 UTC (8:00 pm EDT, July 25) – Tropical Depression Bob merges with a trough, marking its dissipation, over the Appalachian Mountains along the Virginia–West Virginia border.

August

August 9
18:00 UTC (2:00 p.m.
August 9
00:00 UTC (8:00 p.m. EDT, August 8) – The subtropical depression acquires a warm core, spiral banding, and gale-force winds.
August 12
18:00 UTC (3:00 p.m. ADT) – Tropical Storm Claudette makes its closest approach to Bermuda, passing  to the north.
August 12
00:00 UTC (8:00 p.m.
August 13
Around 06:00 UTC (2:00 a.m. EDT) – Tropical Depression Four brushes the Guanahacabibes Peninsula in Cuba before emerging over the Gulf of Mexico.
August 14
00:00 UTC (7:00 p.m.
August 14
06:00 UTC (3:00 a.m. ADT) – Tropical Storm Claudette attains hurricane-status about 725 mi (1,165 km) northeast of Bermuda.
August 15

00:00 UTC (7:00 p.m.
12:00 UTC (9:00 a.m.
16:20 UTC (11:20 a.m.
16:30 UTC (11:30 a.m.
August 16
00:00 UTC (9:00 p.m. ADT, August 15) – Hurricane Claudette weakens to a tropical storm about 220 mi 350 km southwest of Flores Island, Azores.
Around 06:00 UTC (3:00 a.m.
00:00 UTC (7:00 p.m.
August 17
00:00 UTC (9:00 p.m.
12:00 UTC (7:00 a.m.
August 19
00:00 UTC (8:00 p.m.
August 28
00:00 UTC (8:00 p.m. EDT, August 27) – Tropical Depression Five forms over the Windward Passage between Cuba and Haiti
Between 00:00 and 06:00 UTC (8:00 p.m. EDT, August 27 – 2:00 a.m.
August 28
18:00 UTC (2:00 p.m. EDT) – Tropical Depression Five strengthens into Tropical Storm Elena just southeast of Cifuentes, Cuba, while still over land.
August 29
00:00 UTC (8:00 p.m. EDT, August 28) – Tropical Storm Elena emerges over the Gulf of Mexico just north of Santa Cruz del Norte, Cuba.
12:00 UTC (8:00 a.m.
August 30
12:00 UTC (7:00 a.m.

September

September 1
06:00 UTC (2:00 a.m.
September 2
00:00 UTC (7:00 p.m.
September 2
13:00 UTC (8:00 a.m.
18:00 UTC (1:00 p.m.
September 3
06:00 UTC (1:00 a.m.
September 4
1800 UTC (1:00 p.m. CDT) – Tropical Depression Elena dissipates over eastern Missouri.
September 8 
12:00 UTC (3:00 a.m.
September 9
06:00 UTC (3:00 a.m.
September 11
12:00 UTC (9:00 a.m.
18:00 UTC (3:00 p.m.
Between 18:00 and 00:00 UTC (3:00–9:00 p.m.
September 13
12:00 UTC (9:00 a.m. ADT) – The unnumbered tropical depression dissipates about 740 mi (1,195 km) east of Bermuda.
18:00 UTC (2:00 p.m.
September 15
1800 UTC (2:00 p.m. EDT) – Tropical Depression Seven developed 150 miles (240 km) north of Grand Turk Island.

October
October 7
1200 UTC (8:00 a.m. AST) – Tropical Depression Ten developed near the coastline of the Dominican Republic province of Puerto Plata.
1800 UTC (2:00 p.m. AST) – Tropical Depression Ten strengthens into Tropical Storm Isabel.
October 8
2100 UTC (5:00 p.m.
October 10
2100 UTC (5:00 p.m.
October 11
0000 UTC (8:00 p.m. EDT October 10) – Tropical Storm Isabel weakens to a tropical depression.
October 15
1800 UTC (2:00 p.m.
October 26
0000 UTC (7:00 p.m.
1200 UTC (7:00 a.m. CDT) – Tropical Depression Eleven strengthens into Tropical Storm Juan.
October 28
0000 UTC (7:00 p.m. CDT October 27) – Tropical Storm Juan strengthens into a Category 1 hurricane.
1800 UTC (1:00 p.m.
October 29
Shortly before 1200 UTC (7:00 a.m.
1800 UTC (1:00 p.m.) – Hurricane Juan weakened to a tropical storm.
October 31
0600-1200 UTC (1:00–7:00 a.m.

November
November 30
The 1985 Atlantic hurricane season officially ends.

December
December 7
December 8
December 9

See also

Lists of Atlantic hurricanes

References

External links
 nhc.noaa.gov, National Hurricane Center homepage

1985 Atlantic hurricane season
1985 meteorology
1985
1985 ATL T